Defending champion Richard Sears defeated Clarence Clark in the final, 6–1, 6–4, 6–0 to win the men's singles tennis title at the 1882 U.S. National Championships. Except for the final, each match was played on the best of three sets. Winner of a set was the player who won six games first, no two-games advantage was required. Participation was restricted to US citizens only.

Draw

Finals

Earlier rounds

Section 1

Section 2

Section 3

References 

 

Men's Singles
1882